The men's 10,000 metres at the 2013 World Championships in Athletics were held at the Luzhniki Stadium on 10 August.

With the temperature at the start of the race over 27º the competitors were taking heat precautions.  Olympic Champion Mo Farah dropped to last place in the early stages, later there occasions when he would go to the front of the pack, though he made no effort to quicken the pace from the lead.  With the lead pack down to about 10, with a kilometer to go, American Dathan Ritzenhein charged around the pack and into the lead.  That woke up the rest of the contenders, quickly swallowing up Ritzenhein's effort.  After some jockeying by a host of contenders, Farah seized the lead just before the last lap.  Down the backstretch, the remaining contenders, Ibrahim Jeilan, Paul Tanui and Galen Rupp sprinted to keep up with Farah and rounding the final turn, defending champion Jeilan seemed to be moving into position to repeat his sprint past Farah to the finish.  But unlike 2011, Farah had an extra gear to hold off Jeilan, crossing the line holding his hands high, before doing his post race "Mobot" dance.  The 27:21.71 sets a new Russian all comers record.

Records
Prior to the competition, the records were as follows:

Qualification standards

Schedule

Results

Final
The race was started at 18:55.

References

External links
10000 metres results at IAAF website

10000
10,000 metres at the World Athletics Championships